Tiia-Maria Talvitie (born 3 April 1994) is a Finnish biathlete.

References

1994 births
Living people
Finnish female biathletes